Deterding is a surname. Notable people with the surname include:

Henri Deterding (1866–1939), Dutch business executive 
Olga Deterding (1927–1978), British heiress and socialite